The Tominé Reservoir (Spanish: Embalse del Tominé) is a reservoir in northern Cundinamarca, Colombia about  north of Bogotá. Its objectives are to control water levels for hydroelectric plants in the region and supply drinking water to Bogotá. It is adjacent to the municipalities of Sesquilé and Guatavita.

History 
The reservoir was completed in 1967. The town of Guatavita was intentionally flooded for the construction and functioning of the reservoir. Guatavita was rebuilt on higher grounds. Today, Tominé hosts water sports and other water-related events. The reservoir, the biggest on the Bogotá savanna, is seven times larger than the Neusa and Sisga Reservoirs. At lowstand lake levels, the top of the tower of the old church of Guatavita is visible above the water level.

Gallery

Panoramas

See also 

Lake Guatavita, Lake Suesca

References

External links 

  Cundinamarca department official website
  Guatavita - Universidad de los Andes

Geography of Cundinamarca Department
Lakes of Colombia
Lake Tomine
Hydroelectricity in Colombia